Crystal Lake is a city in Hancock County, Iowa, United States. The population was 253 at the 2020 census.

History
Crystal Lake was platted in 1898, and incorporated as a city in 1899.

Geography
Crystal Lake is located at  (43.223564, -93.792073).

The city of Crystal Lake is located on the south shore of Crystal Lake, a popular fishing location.

Demographics

2010 census
As of the census of 2010, there were 250 people, 121 households, and 69 families residing in the city. The racial makeup of the city was 97.2% White, 1.6% African American, 0.4% Native American, and 0.8% from two or more races. Hispanic or Latino of any race were 4.0% of the population.

There were 121 households, of which 19.8% had children under the age of 18 living with them, 40.5% were married couples living together, 12.4% had a female householder with no husband present, 4.1% had a male householder with no wife present, and 43.0% were non-families. 36.4% of all households were made up of individuals, and 13.2% had someone living alone who was 65 years of age or older. The average household size was 2.07 and the average family size was 2.65.

The median age in the city was 47.8 years. 18% of residents were under the age of 18; 7.6% were between the ages of 18 and 24; 18.4% were from 25 to 44; 33.6% were from 45 to 64; and 22.4% were 65 years of age or older. The gender makeup of the city was 48.4% male and 51.6% female.

2000 census
As of the census of 2000, there were 285 people, 127 households, and 75 families residing in the city. The racial makeup of the city was 99.65% White and 0.35% Asian. Hispanic or Latino of any race were 1.40% of the population.

There were 127 households, out of which 23.6% had children under the age of 18 living with them, 46.5% were married couples living together, 7.9% had a female householder with no husband present, and 40.9% were non-families. 32.3% of all households were made up of individuals, and 14.2% had someone living alone who was 65 years of age or older. The average household size was 2.24 and the average family size was 2.81.

In the city, the population was spread out, with 21.1% under the age of 18, 10.5% from 18 to 24, 23.5% from 25 to 44, 28.4% from 45 to 64, and 16.5% who were 65 years of age or older. The median age was 42 years. For every 100 females, there were 92.6 males. For every 100 females age 18 and over, there were 87.5 males.

The median income for a household in the city was $29,615, and the median income for a family was $32,500. Males had a median income of $26,250 versus $26,429 for females. The per capita income for the city was $14,927. About 20.3% of families and 19.1% of the population were below the poverty line, including 21.1% of those under the age of eighteen and 17.2% of those 65 or over.

Education
Residents are part of the Forest City Community School District. It was a part of the Woden–Crystal Lake Community School District until July 1, 2013, when it consolidated into the Forest City district.

References

Cities in Iowa
Cities in Hancock County, Iowa
1898 establishments in Iowa